Old School Freight Train (OSFT) was a Charlottesville, Virginia-based band that combined bluegrass, jazz, Latin, and Celtic sounds to create their music.

Career
The band's eponymous debut album, Old School Freight Train, was met with considerable acclaim. Relix magazine, included them in their "Artists Too New to Know" series in May 2005. Daniel Gewertz of the Boston Herald called them: "The most talented young string band in the land."

Mandolin master David Grisman heard their music in the Fall of 2004 and invited them record at his Dawg Studios in Mill Valley, California.  He manned the production and recording himself with the help of Dave Dennison. From these sessions came Run, OSFT's second album and their first for Acoustic Disc, Grisman's acclaimed independent label.  He says of the experience:

They have backed David Grisman as his band on several tours in 2005 and 2006. They opened for Merle Haggard on May 3, 2006, at the Charlottesville Pavilion.  They were co-billed with King Wilkie at the Starr Hill Music Hall in Charlottesville, Virginia November 15, 2006.  They played at the Kennedy Center in Washington, D.C. on September 23, 2006.

The band's tour schedule has included the Newport Folk Festival, MerleFest, Wintergrass, Strawberry Music Festival, and the Menokin Bluegrass Festival in Warsaw, Virginia. In 2007, they played the Stagecoach Festival in Indio, California.

Six Years was released on March 17, 2009.  The group has since disbanded.

Reception
Tim Dickinson, National Affairs Correspondent for Rolling Stone, said of the group's sound:

Relix magazine, including OSFT in their "Artists Too New to Know" series in May 2005, described their playing as:

Daniel Gewertz of the Boston Herald noted:

David Grisman, who recorded their album Run on his independent label, said:

In his review of Six Years, John Borgmeyer said in the C-Ville Weekly:

{{quote|Six Years marks an evolution for Charlottesville's Old School Freight Train, in which the band leaps from the well-traveled track of "newgrass" onto a blend of pop and traditional music that's all its own.<ref>'C-Ville Weekly March 17, 2009 - March 23, 2009, "Freight Train Jumps The Track"; Six Years review by John Borgmeyer</ref>}}

Personnel

Old School Freight Train's vocalist, songwriter, and guitarist was Jesse Harper. Pete Frostic played mandolin, Nate Leath played fiddle, Darrell Muller played upright bass, and Nick Falk was the drummer.

Former members have included Ann Marie Calhoun (née Simpson) on the fiddle, and Ben Krakauer on banjo. They went on to play in Walker's Run.  Calhoun has also performed with Jethro Tull, Steve Vai, and well as Ringo Starr.  She was also the "My GRAMMY Moment 2008" winner on the 50th Annual GRAMMY Awards, chosen to perform with the Foo Fighters live.

Discography

AlbumsOld School Freight Train (2002), Courthouse Records – ASIN: B000083GLJPickin' On John Mayer: A Bluegrass Tribute (2003), Various Artists CMH RecordsPickin' On Wilco: Casino Side (2004), CMH Records – ASIN: B000294ROERun (2005), Acoustic Disc – ASIN: B00080Z66KPickin' On Coldplay: A Bluegrass Tribute (2005), Various Artists CMH Records – ASIN: B00070Q886Pickin' On John Mayer Vol. 2 (2005), Various Artists CMH RecordsLive in Ashland (2006) – ASIN: B000WGX6LMSix Years (2009) Red Distribution — ASIN: B001QWEE3A

Guest appearances
 Josh Ritter, Live at the 9:30 Club (April 19, 2008) - "Next to the Last True Romantic"

References

Further reading
"New Dawgs: Old School Freight Train" by Rudi Greenberg, May 27, 2008, Express"Old School Freight Train: Not a 1-way ticket" Lancaster New Era'', July 26, 2007

External links
MySpace Page Old School Freight Train
Acoustic Disc profile
Old School Freight Train collection at the Internet Archive's live music archive

American bluegrass music groups
Musical groups from Virginia
American folk musical groups